Eupteryx is a genus of leafhoppers in the family Cicadellidae.

Species
Species of Eupteryx include the following:

References

Further reading

 
 

Cicadellidae genera
Typhlocybini
Taxa named by John Curtis